Ratannagar (Heritage city) is city, near Churu city, and a municipality in Churu district in the Indian state of Rajasthan.

Demographics
 India census, Ratannagar had a population of 11,018. Males constitute 50% of the population and females 50%. Ratannagar has an average literacy rate of 60%, higher than the national average of 59.5%: male literacy is 72%, and female literacy is 49%. In Ratannagar, 17% of the population is under 6 years of age.

References

Cities and towns in Churu district